Jamie Howarth is an American television and film composer and musical director. Howarth also restores damaged soundtracks from old films. He owns a company for sound restoration, called Plangent Processes. One of its more notable restorations is the soundtrack for the 1958 production of South Pacific, starring Mitzi Gaynor and Rossano Brazzi. The restored version of the track was released in 2006.

Howarth was born in New Jersey, and, as of 2002, resides in Nantucket. He lived in New York City, New York, in the eighties and nineties, during which period he worked at various media facilities including the Hit Factory, ABC-TV, and AudioTechniques.

Awards and nominations
He has been nominated for four Daytime Emmy awards for his work on "One Life to Live", and won three times; twice in 2000 for Outstanding Achievement in Music Direction and Composition for a Drama Series and Outstanding Achievement in Live & Direct to Tape Sound Mixing for a Drama Series, and once in 2001 for Outstanding Achievement in Live & Direct to Tape Sound Mixing for a Drama Series. His nomination in 1995 was for Outstanding Drama Series Directing Team. He also won a Directors Guild of America award in 2000, for Outstanding Directorial Achievement in Daytime Serials, for his work on "One Life to Live".

His first Daytime Emmy nomination was shared with Jill Mitwell, Peter Miner, David Pressman, Lonny Price, Gary Tomlin, Frank Valentini, Jim McDonald, Tracy Casper Lang, Mary Kelly Rodden, and James Sayegh. His first win was shared with Paul Glass, David Nichtern, Dominic Messinger, Kevin Bents, Lee Holdridge, Bette Sussman, and Rob Mounsey. His Directors Guild of America win was shared with Jill Mitwell, Owen Renfroe, Alan P. Needleman, 
Richard A. Manfredi, and Teresa Anne Cicala.

Howarth's company, Plangent Processes, has been nominated for 3 Grammy awards, including Errol Garner's Concert by the Sea and 2 wins for The Rolling Stones "Charley is My Darling" and for Best Historical Album in 2008, for their restoration of The Live Wire, a recorded live performance by Woody Guthrie, in 1949. Plangent Processes has also restored master tapes for Bruce Springsteen, Queen, Grateful Dead, the Neil Young Archives, Doc Watson, Tim Buckley, Pete Seeger, and the Andy Warhol estate, among others. Film soundtrack restoration for From Here to Eternity, Close Encounters of the Third Kind, Cabaret, Camelot and West Side Story among others.

Credits
 One Life to Live (music director and mixer, 1999–2001)
 Threat of Exposure (composer, 2002)
 Silence (composer, 2003)

References

External links
 
 Official website for Plangent Process
 Howarth discusses Plangent Process (Video)

Year of birth missing (living people)
Living people
Musicians from Philadelphia
American male composers
21st-century American composers
Emmy Award winners
Grammy Award winners
21st-century American male musicians